The Diocese of London forms part of the Church of England's Province of Canterbury in England.

It lies directly north of the Thames. For centuries the diocese covered a vast tract and bordered the dioceses of Norwich and Lincoln to the north and west. This area covers nearly all of the historic county of Middlesex. It includes the City of London in which lies its cathedral, St Paul's, and also encompasses Spelthorne which is in modern-day Surrey.

The Report of the Commissioners appointed by his Majesty to inquire into the Ecclesiastical Revenues of England and Wales (1835), noted the annual net income for the London see was £13,929. This made it the third wealthiest diocese in England after Canterbury and Durham.

The historic county of Essex formed part of the diocese until 1846 when it became part of the Diocese of Rochester, after which St Albans and since 1914 forms the Diocese of Chelmsford.

Organisation
Following the huge growth of the metropolis and its population in the 19th century, successive Bishops of London successfully campaigned for the appointment of several suffragan bishops to assist them in the care of the northern half of what became the County of London and later Greater London. A system of assigning "districts" to these suffragans evolved into an experimental area scheme in 1970. An archbishop's commission on the diocesan arrangements in Greater London was established in 1975 and chaired by Edmund Compton; its report considered but did not recommend forming all Greater London into an ecclesiastical province.

Since the formal institution of the London area scheme (the first of its kind) in 1979, the diocese has been divided into five episcopal areas, each of which is the particular responsibility of one of the diocese's suffragan bishops. It is further divided into archdeaconries and deaneries, as shown below.

Bishops
Under the London area scheme the diocesan bishop, the Bishop of London retains oversight of the two cities of London and Westminster while the four area bishops have responsibility in their own episcopal areas. The suffragan see of Stepney was created in 1895, Kensington in 1901, Willesden in 1911 and Edmonton in 1970. The suffragan see of Marlborough existed from 1888 to 1918. On 1 May 2015, it was announced that Richard Chartres' (then-Bishop of London) proposal to take the See of Islington out of abeyance for the appointment of a "bishop for church plants" would go ahead. Ric Thorpe was consecrated bishop suffragan of Islington on 29 September 2015.

Alternative episcopal oversight (for parishes in the diocese which do not accept the ordination of women as priests) is provided by a fifth suffragan bishop, Jonathan Baker, Bishop of Fulham, who has the same ministry in the Southwark and Rochester dioceses. During a lengthy vacancy in that see, alternative episcopal oversight was offered by the area Bishop of Edmonton.

There are also several retired bishops living in the diocese, some of whom are licensed as honorary assistant bishops:
1984–present: Michael Marshall, former suffragan Bishop of Woolwich, lives in Chelsea and is also licensed as an honorary assistant bishop in Chichester diocese.
2002–present: Edward Holland, retired Bishop of Colchester, lives in Hammersmith and is also licensed in the Diocese in Europe.
2003–present: Walter Makhulu, Archbishop emeritus of Central Africa and retired Bishop of Botswana, lives in Putney.
2006–present: Sandy Millar, a former vicar of Holy Trinity Brompton, lives in Aldeburgh, Suffolk and is also an honorary assistant bishop in the Diocese of St Edmundsbury and Ipswich.
2009–present: Robert Ladds, former Bishop suffragan of Whitby, lives in Hendon.
2013–present: Michael Colclough, retired canon pastor of St Paul's Cathedral and former bishop of Kensington, lives in Chelsea. He is also licensed in the diocese in Europe.
July 2014present: Stephen Platten, former rector of St Michael Cornhill and retired bishop of Wakefield (also in Southwark and Newcastle dioceses.)

Schools
The London Diocesan Board for Schools (LDBS) has responsibility for 163 Church of England schools within the London diocese, across  18 local authorities.

Fraud 
In December 2022, Martin Sargeant, formerly Head of Operations in the Two Cities, was sentenced at Southwark Crown Court to five years in prison for defrauding the London Diocese of £5.2m.

See also
List of churches in the City of London
List of churches in the City of Westminster
List of churches in the Diocese of London
Roman Catholic Archdiocese of Westminster

References

External links
Diocesan website
Map from the diocesan website
Westminster (St Margaret) Deanery Synod

 
Christianity in London